Acacia hamersleyensis, also known as Karijini wattle or Hamersley Range wattle, is a tree or shrub belonging to the genus Acacia and the subgenus Juliflorae. It is endemic to a small area in central Western Australia.

Description
It can be spreading, bushy or openly branched or have a rounded or obconic habit with up to six main stems emerging from ground level. Older specimens can appear gnarled with a spreading sparse canopy. The dark brown to grey or black coloured bark can be smooth on higher branches but longitudinally fissured and fibrous on the main stems especially toward the base. The glabrous branchlets have a yellowish to light brown colour sometimes with a pale powdery coating that is a more orange colour at the extremities. Like most species of Acacia it has phyllodes rather than true leaves. It blooms from July to September producing yellow flowers. The slightly glossy grey-brown seeds are arranged obliquely in the pods.

Distribution
It is native to an area in the Pilbara region of Western Australia mostly in the Hamersley Range around Newman in the east extending through Wittenoom and Paraburdoo in the west with small outlier populations in the Carnarvon Range in the Little Sandy Desert. It is usually situated along ridges and on the higher slopes of ranges, in rocky gullies and on scree slopes and occasionally in the creeklines that flow down from the ranges. It will grow in iron-rich skeletal soils over ironstone bed rock.

See also
List of Acacia species

References

hamersleyensis
Acacias of Western Australia
Plants described in 1982
Taxa named by Bruce Maslin